Diglyphus is a genus of hymenopteran insects of the family Eulophidae.

References
Key to Nearctic eulophid genera 
Universal Chalcidoidea Database

External links
Diglyphus spp. on the UF / IFAS Featured Creatures Web site

Eulophidae